The 1922 Coupe de France Final was a football match held at Stade Pershing, Paris on 7 May 1922, that saw Red Star Olympique defeat Stade Rennais UC 2–0 on goals by Paul Nicolas and Raymond Sentubéry.

Match details

See also
Coupe de France 1921-1922

External links
Coupe de France results at Rec.Sport.Soccer Statistics Foundation
Report on French federation site

Coupe De France Final
1922
Coupe De France Final 1922
Coupe De France Final 1922
May 1922 sports events
1922 in Paris